Christine Michelle Metz (born September 29, 1980) is an  American actress and singer. She played Kate Pearson in the television series This Is Us (2016–2022), which earned her nominations for a Primetime Emmy Award and two Golden Globe Awards. She has also appeared in films such as Sierra Burgess Is a Loser (2018) and Breakthrough (2019).

Early life
Metz was born in Homestead, Florida, to Denise and Mark Metz on September 29, 1980. She spent her early years in Japan, where her father was stationed for the US Navy. The family later moved to Gainesville, Florida, where she attended elementary, middle, and high school. She grew up with her mother, stepfather, two siblings, two half-siblings, and a dog named Jack.

Metz has said that her first job was at McDonald's restaurant in Gainesville. She took it in order to buy a $120 pair of sneakers which her mother refused to buy for her. She fondly recalls that her manager treated both her and her fellow employees with respect and dignity. She learned early on the benefits of hard work and the advantages of being nice to other people.

Career
She played Kate Pearson in the NBC drama series This Is Us, which earned her Primetime Emmy Award and Golden Globe Award nominations. She played Ima Wiggles in FX's American Horror Story: Freak Show.

Metz is a singer in her band Chrissy and the Vapors.

In early 2018, it was announced that Metz would star in Breakthrough, working with producer DeVon Franklin. She is cast as Joyce Smith, the mother of John, a 14-year-old boy who fell through an icy Missouri lake and was proclaimed dead. The movie, based on the book written by Smith, explores the mother's belief that her son was brought back to life by God interceding through her and other's prayers. In 2021, Metz voiced a character in Muppets Haunted Mansion.

Metz studies with acting coach John Kirby.

Personal life
On January 5, 2008, Metz married British journalist Martyn Eaden at the courthouse in Santa Barbara, California. They separated in January 2013, and Eaden filed for divorce from Metz in November 2014, citing "irreconcilable differences." On December 11, 2015, their divorce was finalized. 

From 2016 to 2018 she dated Josh Stancil, who was a cameraman for This is Us. She dated composer Hal Rosenfeld from 2018 to 2020. In 2020 during the pandemic, Metz began dating songwriter and former music executive Bradley Collins after meeting him on the dating app Bumble. They co-wrote a children's book When I Talk to God, I Talk About You.

Metz has battled with obesity most her life. In 2017, she lost 50 lbs by trying Weight Watchers, but soon she started to gain back. In 2020, she revealed that she had lost 100 lbs, with a help of a nutritionist and personal trainer.

Metz is a Christian.

Filmography

Film

Television

Awards and nominations

References

External links

 

1980 births
Living people
21st-century American actresses
Actresses from Florida
American television actresses
People from Homestead, Florida
American film actresses
American Christians